Sebastian Plate (born 7 August 1979) is a German football player. He spent two seasons in the Bundesliga with Borussia Mönchengladbach.

References

1979 births
Living people
German footballers
Borussia Mönchengladbach II players
Borussia Mönchengladbach players
Bundesliga players
Association football defenders